The Miller Park neighborhood in North Omaha, Nebraska is a historically significant community housing a historic district and several notable historic places. It is located between Sorenson Parkway on the south and Redick Avenue on the north, Florence Boulevard on the east and 30th Street on the west. The Minne Lusa neighborhood borders on the north, and the Saratoga neighborhood is on the south. Fort Omaha borders the neighborhood on the west. Miller Park is the namesake park in the neighborhood, as well as the Miller Park Elementary School. In 2017, the Miller Park/Minne Lusa area was ranked as having the 2nd highest rate of homicides and other violent crimes out of 81 Omaha neighborhoods.

About
Miller Park is named for Dr. George L. Miller, a founding father of the city of Omaha. He was the first physician in Omaha, and later in life, a major landowner throughout the city, including all of the area comprising the neighborhood today. Miller was also the first president of the City of Omaha Board of Park Commissioners.

Once considered a possible location for the Trans-Mississippi Exposition of 1898. It was a running consideration for the Expo because of its accessibility via the Florence Boulevard, a north-south thoroughfare once regarded as "The Prettiest Mile" because it captured the best views of the Missouri River valley, and because of the wide-open fields the area offered. After losing out to Kountze Park to the south because of its distance from the city, the Miller Park neighborhood rebounded, quickly developing with upper-middle-class homes surrounding the perimeter of the park.

Omaha State Senator Lowen Kruse is a past president of the Miller Park-Minne Lusa Neighborhood Association.

Miller Park was established in 1891 after George Miller failed to locate the Trans-Mississippi Exposition there two years before. He convinced the city of Omaha to build Omaha's Prettiest Mile Boulevard to the park the following year, which later became known as Florence Boulevard.

Fort Omaha
The Miller Park neighborhood is home to the Fort Omaha Historic District. Inside the Fort there are dozens of historical buildings, with the Guard House designated by the City of Omaha as an Omaha Landmark, and the General Crook House listed independently on the National Register of Historic Places.

See also
 Miller Park (North Omaha)
 Miller Park Elementary School
 Pearl Memorial United Methodist Church
 Neighborhoods of North Omaha, Nebraska
 History of Omaha
 Architecture of North Omaha, Nebraska

External links
Miller Park Neighborhood Association website.
Historic photo of Miller Park. 
Miller Park Pavilion
Photo of Miller Park Leisure Pool
Historic postcard of the local Pearl Memorial United Methodist Church

References

Neighborhoods in Omaha, Nebraska
History of North Omaha, Nebraska
Historic districts in Omaha, Nebraska